Graham Bowman (born 2 January 1993) is a Scottish footballer, who plays for Brechin City as a goalkeeper. Bowman has also previously played for Falkirk, Stenhousemuir and Albion Rovers.

Career
A member of Falkirk's under-19 squad, Bowman was promoted to the first team for season 2011–12 as cover for Michael McGovern. He was an unused substitute on 29 occasions, before making his debut as a 17th-minute substitute on 17 March 2012, against Ross County following the sending off of Michael McGovern. He made his first start the following week against Livingston.

Bowman signed for Stenhousemuir in March 2017, leaving at the end of the season to sign for Scottish League One side Albion Rovers on 2 June 2017.

Career statistics

Honours
Falkirk
Scottish Challenge Cup: 2011–12

References

1993 births
Living people
Footballers from Falkirk
Scottish footballers
Association football goalkeepers
Falkirk F.C. players
Stenhousemuir F.C. players
Albion Rovers F.C. players
Scottish Football League players
Scottish Professional Football League players
Brechin City F.C. players